Kudal taluka is a taluka in Sindhudurg district of Maharashtra, India.

References

Talukas in Sindhudurg district
Talukas in Maharashtra